The Church of Jesus Christ of Latter-day Saints (LDS Church) has had a presence in Italy since 1850.

History

19th century 
During the October 1849 general conference, Brigham Young called Lorenzo Snow and Joseph Toronto to open missionary work in Italy. While en route to Italy, Snow called T. B. H. Stenhouse and Jabez Woodard to serve in the new mission. They arrived in Genoa on 25 June 1850, and Snow offered a prayer dedicating Italy to the preaching of the gospel and organized the Italian Mission on 19 September on a mountain peak near the city of Torre Pellice. On 27 October, Snow baptized the first convert. The first Italian-language edition of the Book of Mormon was published in London in 1852.

In 1853 a group of approximately 70 Waldensians, including men, women, and children left their homes in the Piedmont Valleys and migrated to Salt Lake City, Utah Territory, after being converted by Lorenzo Snow. These Waldensians maintained their cultural heritage, while passing on their mixture of Mormon and Waldensian faiths to their descendants. Their descendants still consider themselves both Mormon and Waldensian, and have met occasionally over the many decades to celebrate both heritages.

The mission closed in 1867, after everyone baptized had either migrated to Utah Territory or left the church.

20th century 
Unsuccessful attempts were made to resume proselytizing, but legal permission was not granted to do so. Members of the church finally returned to Italy during World War II as foreign servicemen: nearly 2,000 LDS military personnel were in the region during the mid-1940s, and there remains a LDS military presence in Italy ever since.

Vincenzo Di Francesca was one of the first converts in Italy in the 20th century, and his story was documented in the 1987 LDS Church film How Rare a Possession.

In 1964 a new Italian-language translation of the Book of Mormon was published, and Ezra Taft Benson successfully negotiated with Italian government officials to allow missionary work to begin again. In early 1965, elders from the Swiss Mission were assigned to cities in Italy, and on August 2, 1966, Benson reestablished the Italian Mission, with headquarters in Florence. By 1971 there was a second mission opened in Italy, and in 1977 there were four missions: Rome, Catania, Milan, and Padova. That same year Spencer W. Kimball visited Italy, the first church president to do so. After many years of effort, formal legal status in Italy was granted to the church in 1993.

21st century 
In 2008, the church announced the planned construction of the Rome Italy Temple, the first temple in Italy.

In 2016, Massimo De Feo became the first Italian national to be appointed a general authority of the church.

Stakes
As of February 2023, the following stakes had congregations in Italy:

Missions
Italy Milan Mission
Italy Rome Mission

Temples
The Rome Italy Temple serves all stakes in Italy. Prior to its completion, Bern Switzerland was the nearest temple.

See also

Religion in Italy

Notes

References
Lia McClanahan, "Latter-day Saints in Italy: A Legacy of Faith", Liahona, June 2014

External links
LDS News and Events - Italy
LDS Newsroom - Italy
Italy entry at LDS Newsroom - includes a brief history 
The Church of Jesus Christ of Latter-day Saints - Official Site (Italy)
The Church of Jesus Christ of Latter-day Saints - Visitors Site

 
Christian denominations in Italy
1850 establishments in Italy
1850 in Christianity